Robert B. Smith may refer to: 

 Robert B. Smith (Virginia mayor) (fl. mid-20th century), American politician
 Robert Bache Smith (1875–1951), American librettist and lyricist
 Robert Black Smith, member of the Legislative Assembly of New Brunswick
 Robert Burns Smith (1854–1908), American politician, Governor of Montana
 Robert Smith (defensive end), American football player

See also
Robert Smith (disambiguation)